Cassytha melantha is a parasitic vine. Common names include coarse dodder-laurel and large dodder-laurel. These are edible and are harvested in the wild.

The species occurs in the states of Western Australia, South Australia, Tasmania, Victoria and New South Wales in Australia.

The name has sometimes been misapplied to Cassytha filiformis.

References

melantha
Laurales of Australia
Flora of New South Wales
Flora of South Australia
Flora of Victoria (Australia)
Flora of Tasmania
Angiosperms of Western Australia
Parasitic plants
Taxa named by Robert Brown (botanist, born 1773)